Madeleine Harris (born 28 April 2001) is a British actress known for her roles in Paddington (2014) and Man Down (2013–2016).

Life and work 
Harris grew up in London and Shepton Mallet, Somerset.

In 2012, Harris got her first professional acting job in Casualty. She played Izzy Forrester who caused a road collision. After this Harris appeared in the television programmes Me and Mrs Jones and The White Queen. In 2013 she played the 460 years old vampire Hetty in the TV series Being Human.

In 2014, she appeared in the film Paddington, beating more than 100 competitors for the role. She stars in the film alongside Hugh Bonneville, Sally Hawkins, Julie Walters, Jim Broadbent, Peter Capaldi, and Nicole Kidman. Harris played Judy Brown, the daughter of the family with whom Paddington lives, and later reprised the role in the sequel Paddington 2.

From 2013 to 2016 she starred as Karen in the sitcom Man Down.

As of 2014 Harris still attended school, and manages to combine her school work and her acting jobs. Harris also likes other artistic disciplines. She has enjoyed writing her own stories since she was young.

Filmography

References

External links 
 

2001 births
Living people
English film actresses
English television actresses
21st-century English actresses
Actresses from London
English child actresses